Osiedle Bema is one of the districts of the Polish city of Białystok. It is named after General Józef Bem, national hero of Poland.

External links 

Districts of Białystok